Boxing Day is a Commonwealth holiday.

Boxing Day may also refer to:
 Boxing Day (2007 film), a film by Kriv Stenders
 Boxing Day (2012 film), a film by Bernard Rose
 Boxing Day (2021 film), a film by Aml Ameen
 "Boxing Day", an episode of Bedtime
 "Boxing Day", a song by Relient K from the album Let It Snow, Baby... Let It Reindeer

See also
 Boxing Day Blizzard, another name for the December 2010 North American blizzard
 Boxing Day Challenge, an annual match that takes place on the 26th of December in England
 Boxing Day Dip, a charity event where people in fancy dress swim in the sea on Boxing Day
 Boxing Day shooting, a Canadian gang-related shooting which occurred on December 26, 2005 in Toronto
 Boxing Day Storm, an Atlantic windstorm in 1998
 Boxing Day Test, a cricket match
 Boxing Day tsunami, an alternate name for the 2004 Indian Ocean earthquake and tsunami